Jyothi is an album by  American jazz alto saxophonist Charlie Mariano and The Karnataka College of Percussion featuring R. A. Ramamani recorded in 1983 and released on the ECM label.

Reception
The Allmusic review by Ron Wynn awarded the album 3 stars stating "Mariano wails, winds, and experiments with Karnataka College of Percussionists".

Track listing
All compositions by R. A. Ramamani
 "Voice Solo" - 5:03   
 "Vandanam" - 7:49   
 "Varshini" - 8:19   
 "Saptarshi" - 6:41   
 "Kartik" - 11:10   
 "Bhajan" - 6:29   
Recorded at Tonstudio Bauer in Ludwigsburg, West Germany in February 1983

Personnel
Charlie Mariano - soprano saxophone, flute
R. A. Ramamani - vocals, tamboura
T. A. S. Mani - mridangam
R. A. Rajagopal - ghatam, morsing, konakkol
T. N. Shashikumar - kanjira, konakkol

References

 

ECM Records albums
Charlie Mariano albums
1983 albums
Albums produced by Manfred Eicher